Rock Island National Cemetery is a United States National Cemetery located within Rock Island Arsenal near the city of Rock Island, Illinois. Administered by the United States Department of Veterans Affairs, it encompasses , and as of the end of 2006, had 24,525 interments. The cemetery is also nearing compliance with the National Shrine guidelines, due to its use of college students during the summer to reset and realign stones. When looking from any one stone there should be seven lines visible and all should be straight.

History 
The cemetery was established in 1863 as a place to inter the remains of American Civil War Union army soldiers. Its initial placement interfered with the expansion of the Arsenal's facilities, so it was moved to a location on the northern end of the island. Civil War veterans who were interred in Oakdale Cemetery in Davenport, Iowa, were later disinterred and moved to the National Cemetery. Property transfers from the Arsenal in 1926, 1936, and 1950 increased the cemetery's area. There are plans for further expansion of this cemetery including an additional pavilion, more land, and a wall for cremations near the tank track.

A second,  cemetery was established near Rock Island National Cemetery to bury Confederate prisoners of war, nearly two thousand of which would die while in captivity on the island, primarily from the harsh living conditions.

Notable interments

Medal of Honor recipients 
 Private First Class Edward J. Moskala (1921–1945), United States Army Medal of Honor recipient for action in World War II
 Private First Class Frank P. Witek (1921–1944), United States Marine Corps Medal of Honor recipient for action in World War II

Other burials
 Gene Baker (1925–1999), Major League Baseball player, coach, and scout
 Lane Evans (1951–2014), Congressman, Illinois's 17th congressional district
 Jeff Pfeffer (1888–1972), Major League Baseball player from 1911 to 1924
 Brevet Brigadier General Thomas Jackson Rodman (1816–1871), commander at the Rock Island Arsenal and developer of the Rodman gun

References

External links
 Rock Island National Cemetery at the U.S. Department of Veterans Administration
 
 
 
 

Illinois in the American Civil War
Cemeteries in Illinois
Quad Cities
Protected areas of Rock Island County, Illinois
United States national cemeteries
National Register of Historic Places in Rock Island County, Illinois
Historic American Landscapes Survey in Illinois
Cemeteries on the National Register of Historic Places in Illinois
Cemeteries in the Quad Cities
Tourist attractions in Rock Island, Illinois
1863 establishments in Illinois